The 2009 Troy Trojans football team represented Troy University in the 2009 NCAA Division I FBS football season. They played their home games at Movie Gallery Stadium in Troy, Alabama and competed in the Sun Belt Conference. The Trojans won their fourth straight Sun Belt championship going undefeated in conference play (8–0) with a regular season record of 9–3.  They were invited to the GMAC Bowl, where they played Mid-American Conference champion Central Michigan and were defeated, 44–41, in two overtimes.

Schedule

Personnel

Coaching staff
 Larry Blakeney – Head Coach
 Neal Brown – Offensive Coordinator/Quarterbacks
 Jeremy Rowell – Defensive Coordinator
 Randy Butler – Defensive Ends/Recruiting Coordinator
 Maurea Crain – Defensive Line
 Kenny Edenfield – Inside Receivers
 Benjy Parker – Linebackers
 John Schlarman – Offensive Line
 Chad Scott – Running Backs
 Richard Shaughnessy – Strength and Conditioning

References

Troy
Troy Trojans football seasons
Sun Belt Conference football champion seasons
Troy Trojans football